Macclesfield RUFC is a rugby union team based in the Cheshire town of Macclesfield and operates four senior sides, senior and junior colts and ten mini/junior teams. The first XV currently play in the fifth tier of the English rugby union system, Regional 1 North West, following their relegation from National League 2 North at the end of the 2018–19 season. The second XV plays in the Cotton Traders Premier League, the third XV play in Standish Media Services division 1 and the fourth XV play in the  Freshlet Division 4.

History
Macclesfield RUFC was formed in 1877 although the present club was formed in 1927. After playing at several venues, the club moved to its present home in 1980. Five years later they participated in the forerunner to the launch of the national league system when they participated in the Girobank North West League. Over the last 25 years Macclesfield have climbed the pyramid spending one season in National One during the 2012–13 Season before being relegated but bouncing straight back after winning promotion during 2013–14 Season. However the 2014–15 saw the Blues relegated back to National 2 at the end of the campaign. They won the old North West 1 in 1991–92, North 2 in 1994–95 and entered the old National 3 North, then the fourth tier of club rugby, in 2002, winning the league in 2009–10, by which it had been  restructured as National League 2 North.

Honours
 North West 1 (1): 1992–93
 North 2 (1): 1994–95
 North 1 v Midlands 1 promotion play-off winners (1): 2002–03
 National League 2 North (3): 2009–10, 2013–14, 2015–16
 National Division 2 Champions Cup (1): 2009–10
 Cheshire Cup
 Winners (8): 1991–92, 1994–95, 2001–02, 2002–03, 2005–06, 2006–07, 2008–09, 2015–16
 Runners-up (2): 2004–05, 2007–08
 Cheshire Plate
 Winners (2): 1981–82, 1993–94

References

External links
 Official website

English rugby union teams
Rugby clubs established in 1877
Rugby union in Cheshire
Macclesfield
1877 establishments in England